was the 9th daimyō of Kaminoyama Domain in Dewa Province during Bakumatsu period Japan, and the 15th chieftain of the Fujii Matsudaira clan. His courtesy title was Yamashiro-no-kami.

Biography
Matsudaira Nobutsune was the eldest son of Matsudaira Nobumichi, the 8th daimyō of Kaminoyama. He became daimyō on the retirement of his father in 1862. During his tenure, he is noted for building an irrigation canal. In late 1867, he was appointed commander of the shogunate forces which (together with forces from Shōnai Domain, participated in the arson attack against the Satsuma Domain residence in Mita, Edo, which was one of the flash-points  for the start of then Boshin War. Kaminoyama Domain's karō, Kaneko Kiyokuni was killed in the attack. During the Boshin War, the domain was a member of the pro-Tokugawa  Ōuetsu Reppan Dōmei. He surrendered to the Meiji government in September 1868 and was placed under house arrest at the clan's bodaiji of Shoko-ji in Tokyo. The domain was reduced in kokudaka by 3000 koku and Nobutsune was forced to retire in favor of his younger brother, Matsudaira Nobuyasu. He  died in 1918 at the age of 75.

References 
 Papinot, Edmond. (1906) Dictionnaire d'histoire et de géographie du japon. Tokyo: Librarie Sansaisha...Click link for digitized 1906 Nobiliaire du japon (2003)
"Tokugawa Shōgun-ke to Matsudaira Ichizoku". Rekishi Dokuhon, Jan. 2006, p. 231.
 The content of much of this article was derived from that of the corresponding article on Japanese Wikipedia.

1844 births
1918 deaths
Daimyo
People of the Boshin War
Fujii-Matsudaira clan